Gerso Fernandes (born 23 February 1991), known as Gerso, is a Bissau-Guinean professional footballer who plays as a left winger for South Korean club Incheon United FC.

Club career

Portugal
Born in Bissau, Gerso moved to Portugal in his early teens, joining C.F. União de Coimbra's youth system in 2004 at age 13. As a junior, he signed with neighbouring Académica de Coimbra where he went on to complete his development; he did not play football for two years during his formative spell, after a priest from the charity facility where he was living advised him against the dangers of turning professional.

Gerso made his debut as a senior with G.D. Tourizense in the third division, who acted as Académica's farm team. Released in summer 2011, he moved to G.D. Estoril Praia of the Segunda Liga, contributing 20 scoreless appearances in his first season as the club returned to the Primeira Liga after seven years.

Gerso made his debut in Portugal's top flight on 17 August 2012, playing 30 minutes in a 2–1 away loss against S.C. Olhanense. He continued to be played almost exclusively as a substitute in the following campaigns by manager Marco Silva. 

For 2014–15, Gerso was loaned to Moreirense F.C. of the same league.

Sporting KC
On 4 January 2017, Sporting Kansas City of Major League Soccer announced the signing of Gerso from C.F. Os Belenenses on a three-year designated player contract, with an option for a fourth year. On 17 May, he scored a hat-trick in a 3–0 win over Seattle Sounders FC at Children's Mercy Park. 

Gerso rejected an offer for a new deal at the end of the 2020 season, and was released.

South Korea
On 16 February 2021, Gerso joined K League 1 club Jeju United FC. Two years later, he moved to Incheon United FC of the same country and league on a free transfer.

Honours
Estoril
Liga de Honra: 2011–12

Sporting Kansas City
U.S. Open Cup: 2017

References

External links

1991 births
Living people
Sportspeople from Bissau
Bissau-Guinean footballers
Association football wingers
Primeira Liga players
Liga Portugal 2 players
Segunda Divisão players
Associação Académica de Coimbra – O.A.F. players
G.D. Tourizense players
G.D. Estoril Praia players
Moreirense F.C. players
C.F. Os Belenenses players
Major League Soccer players
Sporting Kansas City players
Designated Players (MLS)
K League 1 players
Jeju United FC players
Incheon United FC players
Bissau-Guinean expatriate footballers
Expatriate footballers in Portugal
Expatriate soccer players in the United States
Expatriate footballers in South Korea
Bissau-Guinean expatriate sportspeople in Portugal
Bissau-Guinean expatriate sportspeople in the United States